The following outline is provided as an overview of and topical guide to Turin:

Turin – important business and cultural centre, and capital city of the Piedmont region in northern Italy. The city has a rich culture and history, being known for its numerous art galleries, restaurants, churches, palaces, opera houses, piazzas, parks, gardens, theatres, libraries, museums and other venues. Turin is well known for its Renaissance, Baroque, Rococo, Neo-classical, and Art Nouveau architecture. Many of Turin's public squares, castles, gardens and elegant palazzi such as the Palazzo Madama, were built between the 16th and 18th centuries. The city used to be a major European political center. From 1563, it was the capital of the Duchy of Savoy, then of the Kingdom of Sardinia ruled by the Royal House of Savoy, and the first capital of the unified Italy (the Kingdom of Italy) from 1861 to 1865. The city hosts some of Italy's best universities, colleges, academies, lycea and gymnasia, such as the University of Turin, founded in the 15th century, and the Turin Polytechnic. Even though much of its political significance and importance had been lost by World War II, Turin became a major European crossroad for industry, commerce and trade, and is part of the famous "industrial triangle" along with Milan and Genoa. Turin is ranked third in Italy, after Milan and Rome, for economic strength.

General reference 
 Common English name(s): Turin
 Official English name(s): City of Turin
 Adjectival(s): Turinese
 Demonym(s): Turinese

Geography of Turin 

Geography of Turin
 Turin is:
 a city
 capital of Piedmont
 capital of the Metropolitan City of Turin

 Population of Turin: 4,392,526
 Area of Turin: 25,402 km2 (9,808 sq mi) 
 Atlas of Turin

Location of Turin 

 Turin is situated within the following regions:
 Northern Hemisphere and Eastern Hemisphere
 Eurasia
 Europe (outline)
 Western Europe
 Southern Europe
 Italian Peninsula
 Italy (outline)
 Northern Italy
 Northwest Italy
 Piedmont
 Turin metropolitan area
 Metropolitan City of Turin
 Time zone(s): 
 Central European Time (UTC+01)
 Central European Summer Time (UTC+02)

Environment of Turin 

 Climate of Turin

Landforms of Turin 

 Hills in Turin
 Superga
 Rivers in Turin
 Dora Riparia
 Po River
 Valleys in Turin
 Susa Valley

Areas of Turin

Districts of Turin 

 Aurora
 Lingotto

Neighborhoods in Turin 

Neighborhoods in Turin
 Madonna di Campagna
 Valdocco

Locations in Turin 

 Biblioteca Civica Centrale
 Mole Antonelliana
 Ponte Mosca
 Turin National University Library

Ancient monuments in Turin 
 Palatine Towers

Exhibition halls in Turin 
 New Exhibition Hall
 Torino Esposizioni

Monuments in Turin 
 Equestrian monument of Emmanuel Philibert
 Monument to Vittorio Emanuele II

Museums and galleries in Turin 
 Accorsi - Ometto Museum
 Egyptian Museum
 Turin Papyrus Map
 Turin King List
 Judicial Papyrus of Turin
 Turin Erotic Papyrus
 Museo Nazionale dell'Automobile
 Museum of Human Anatomy Luigi Rolando
 Museum of Oriental Art
 Museum of the Risorgimento
 Sabauda Gallery
 Turin City Museum of Ancient Art
 Turin Museum of Natural History

Parks and gardens in Turin 
 Orto Botanico dell'Università di Torino
 Parco del Valentino

Public squares in Turin 

Piazzas in Turin
 Piazza Carlo Felice
 Piazza Castello
 Piazza San Carlo
 Piazza Statuto
 Piazza Vittorio Veneto

Religious sites in Turin 

 Santuario della Consolata

Villas and palaces in Turin 

 Casa Fenoglio-Lafleur
 Castello del Valentino
 Palazzo Carignano
 Palazzo Chiablese
 Palazzo Gualino
 Palazzo Madama
 Royal Palace of Turin
Royal Armoury of Turin
Royal Library of Turin
Portrait of a Man in Red Chalk
 Villa della Regina

Demographics of Turin 

Demographics of Turin

Government and politics of Turin 

Government and politics of Turin
 Elections in Turin
 Turin municipal election, 2016
 Government of Turin
 List of mayors of Turin

History of Turin 
History of Turin

History of Turin, by period or event 
 Timeline of Turin
 Province of Turin
 Treaty of Turin (1381)
 Treaty of Turin (1733)
 Treaty of Turin (1816)
 Treaty of Turin (1860)

History of Turin, by subject 

 1922 Turin Massacre
 Battle of Turin
 Siege of Turin

Culture of Turin 

Culture of Turin
 Architecture of Turin
Skyscrapers in Turin
Piedmont Region Headquarters
Torre Intesa Sanpaolo
Torre Littoria
 Cuisine of Turin
Bicerin
 Languages of Turin
Piedmontese language
 Media in Turin
 Newspapers 
La Stampa
Radio stations in Turin
 People from Turin
 Symbols of Turin

Art in Turin

Cinema of Turin 
 Italian Environmental Film Festival
 National Museum of Cinema
 Torino Film Festival

Music of Turin 

 RAI National Symphony Orchestra
 Turin Conservatory

Theatre of Turin 
 Teatro Carignano
 Teatro Regio

Events and traditions in Turin 
 Prima Esposizione Internazionale d'Arte Decorativa Moderna
 Terra Madre Salone del Gusto
 Turin Auto Show
 Turin International Book Fair
 VIEW Conference

Religion in Turin 

 Christianity in Turin
 Catholicism in Turin
 Roman Catholic Archdiocese of Turin
 Judaism in Turin
 History of the Jews in Turin

Churches in Turin 

 Turin Cathedral
 Chapel of the Holy Shroud
Shroud of Turin
History of the Shroud of Turin
 Basilica of Corpus Domini
 Basilica of Our Lady Help of Christians, Turin
 Basilica of Superga
 Church of San Lorenzo
 Gran Madre di Dio
 Madonna del Pilone
 Monte dei Cappuccini
 San Carlo Borromeo
 San Dalmazzo
 San Filippo Neri
 San Francesco d'Assisi
 Santa Teresa
 Santuario della Consolata

Sports in Turin 

Sports in Turin
 Basketball in Turin
 Auxilium Pallacanestro Torino
 Football in Turin
 Association football in Turin
Juventus F.C.
Juventus F.C.–A.C. Milan rivalry
Juventus F.C. and the Italy national football team
Juventus F.C. ultras
History of Juventus F.C.
List of Juventus F.C. players
Torino F.C.
 Derby della Mole
 Olympics in Turin
 2006 Winter Olympics
2006 Winter Olympics medal table
Palasport Olimpico and Stadio Comunale area in Turin
 Running in Turin
 Turin Marathon
 Sports venues in Turin
Juventus Stadium
Oval Lingotto 
Pala Alpitour
PalaTorino
Stadio Filadelfia
Stadio Olimpico Grande Torino
Torino Palavela

Economy and infrastructure of Turin 

Economy of Turin
 Aerospace industry 
 Avio
 Automotive industry in Turin
 Abarth
 Fiat Automobiles
 Alfa Romeo
Lancia
Maserati
 Iveco
 Banking in Turin
 Intesa Sanpaolo
 Restaurants and cafés in Turin
Caffè Fiorio
Società del Whist
 Tourism in Turin
 Residences of the Royal House of Savoy
 Shroud of Turin

Transportation in Turin 

Transportation in Turin
 Gruppo Torinese Trasporti
 Società Azionaria Gestione Aeroporto Torino

Airports in Turin
 Turin-Aeritalia Airport
 Turin Airport

Rail transport in Turin 

 Turin metropolitan railway service 
 Line SFM1
 Line SFM2
 Line SFM3
 Line SFM4
 Line SFM7
 Line SFMA
 Line SFMB
 Railway stations in Turin
Torino Lingotto railway station
Torino Porta Nuova railway station
Torino Porta Susa railway station
Torino Stura railway station
 Trams in Turin
Sassi–Superga tramway

Turin Metro 
 Turin Metro

 List of Turin metro stations

Car sharing in Turin 

 car2Go (Smart) 
 Enjoy (Fiat 500)
 BlueTorino (Bluecar)

Public bicycle sharing system in Turin 
 ToBike

Education in Turin 

Education in Turin
 Public education in Turin
 Universities in Turin
 University of Turin
University of Turin Department of Law
Department of Law people
 Polytechnic University of Turin (partly-public)
 High schools in Turin
Liceo classico Cavour

Healthcare in Turin 

Hospitals in Turin
 CTO Hospital

See also 

 Outline of geography

References

External links 

Turin City Hall Official website, tourist information
Weather Turin
How to reach Turin?

Turin
Turin
 1